The Time and the Place may refer to:

The Time and the Place (Art Farmer album), 1967
The Time and the Place: The Lost Concert, an album by the Art Farmer Quintet, recorded in 1966 and released in 2011
The Time and the Place (Jimmy Heath album), recorded in 1974 and released in 1994
"The Time and the Place", a composition by Jimmy Heath appearing on all the above albums

See also
 A Time and a Place, a 2010 box set by Emerson, Lake & Palmer